The 2012 BET Hip Hop Awards was held on October 9, 2012, at Atlanta Civic Center in the ATL, hosted by Mike Epps. The nominations were announced on September 13, 2012. Kanye West leads the nominations with 17 nominations, followed by 2 Chainz with 13 and Drake with 11.

Performances
The list of performers was announced on September 13, 2012:

"Work Hard, Play Hard" (Remix)/"Bandz a Make Her Dance" - Wiz Khalifa feat. Young Jeezy & Juicy J
"Amen"/"Young & Gettin' It" - Meek Mill feat. Kirko Bangz
"The Recipe"/"Swimming Pools (Drank)" - Kendrick Lamar 
"Birthday Song"/"I'm Different" - 2 Chainz
"Trap Back Jumpin"/"Go Get It" - T.I.
"Turn on the Lights"/"Same Damn Time" (Remix) - Future feat. Diddy
"Wild Boy" - MGK
"Pop That" - French Montana feat. Uncle Luke
"Hold Me Back"/"Ice Cold" - Rick Ross feat. Omarion

Cyphers
 Internet Exclusive Cypher 1 - Brianna Perry, Relly, Fame, The Kid Daytona, K-La, Tito Lopez
 Internet Exclusive Cypher 2 - Core Masson, Kosha Dillz, Boy Jones
 Internet Exclusive Cypher 3 - Lil Niqo, Lil Waah, Lil Chuckee
 Cypher 1 - Trae tha Truth, Chip, Iggy Azalea, B.o.B, & T.I. of Grand Hustle Records
 Cypher 2 - JUS formally JayBird The Purdi Boi, Hopsin, ScHoolboy Q, Mac Miller, & Mystikal 
 Cypher 3 - Jean Grae, Sarkodie, Ab-Soul, & Talib Kweli 
 Cypher 4 - Angel Haze, Joey Bada$$, Driicky Graham, Childish Gambino, & ASAP Rocky
 Cypher 5 - Xzibit, YG, Kurupt, E-40, DJ Quik, Kendrick Lamar, & Snoop Dogg
 Cypher 6 - Murda Mook, Cassidy, Eve, & DMX of Ruff Ryders

Nominations

Best Hip Hop Video 
 Drake featuring Lil Wayne – "HYFR"
 2 Chainz featuring Drake – "No Lie"
 A$AP Rocky – "Goldie"
 Wale featuring Miguel – "Lotus Flower Bomb"
 Kanye West featuring Big Sean, Pusha T and 2 Chainz – "Mercy"

Reese’s Perfect Combo Award (Best Collabo, Duo or Group) 
Kanye West featuring Big Sean, Pusha T and 2 Chainz – "Mercy"
 2 Chainz featuring Drake – "No Lie"
 Drake featuring Lil Wayne and Tyga – "The Motto (Remix)"
 J. Cole featuring Missy Elliott – "Nobody's Perfect"
 Wale featuring Miguel – "Lotus Flower Bomb"

Best Live Performer 
 The Throne (Jay Z & Kanye West)
 A$AP Rocky
 Drake
 J. Cole
 Kanye West

Lyricist of the Year 
Kendrick Lamar
 J. Cole
 Jay Z
 Nas
 Kanye West

Video Director of the Year  
Hype Williams
A$AP Rocky & Sam Lecca
Benny Boom
Chris Robinson
Kanye West

Producer of the Year 
Kanye West
 Hit-Boy
 J. Cole
 J.U.S.T.I.C.E. League
 No I.D.

MVP of the Year 
 Rick Ross
 2 Chainz
 J. Cole
 Jay Z
 Kanye West

Track of the Year 
Only the producer(s) of the track nominated in this category.
 "Ni**as in Paris" – Produced By Kanye West, Hit-Boy & Mike Dean [The Throne (Jay-Z & Kanye West)]
 "Cashin' Out" – Produced By DJ Spinz (Ca$h Out) 
 "Ima Boss" – Produced By Jahlil Beats (Meek Mill featuring Rick Ross) 
 "No Lie" – Produced By Mike Will Made It and co-produced by Marz (2 Chainz featuring Drake) 
 "The Motto (Remix)" – Produced By T-Minus (Drake featuring Lil Wayne and Tyga)

CD of the Year 
 The Throne (Jay Z & Kanye West) – Watch the Throne
 Common – The Dreamer/The Believer
 Drake – Take Care
 J. Cole – Cole World: The Sideline Story
 Young Jeezy – TM:103 Hustlerz Ambition

DJ of the Year 
DJ Khaled
 DJ Drama
 DJ Enuff
 DJ Envy
 DJ Funkmaster Flex

Rookie of the Year 
 2 Chainz
 A$AP Rocky
 Ca$h Out
 Future
 Meek Mill

Made-You-Look Award (Best Hip-Hop Style) 
Kanye West
 2 Chainz
 A$AP Rocky
 Big Sean
 Nicki Minaj

Best Club Banger 
 The Throne (Jay-Z & Kanye West) – "Ni**as in Paris" (Produced By Kanye West, Hit-Boy & Mike Dean)
Ca$h Out – "Cashin' Out" (Produced By DJ Spinz)
Drake featuring Lil Wayne and Tyga – "The Motto (Remix)" (Produced By T-Minus)
Future – "Same Damn Time" (Produced By Sonny Digital)
 Kanye West featuring Big Sean, Pusha T and 2 Chainz – "Mercy" (Produced By Lifted)

Best Mixtape 
 Meek Mill – Dreamchasers 2
 A$AP Rocky – LIVE.LOVE.A$AP 
 Joey Bada$$ – 1999	 
 Rick Ross – Rich Forever 
 Wiz Khalifa – Taylor Allderdice

Sweet 16: Best Featured Verse 
2 Chainz – "Mercy" (Kanye West featuring Big Sean, Pusha T and 2 Chainz)
 Diddy – "Same Damn Time (Remix)" (Future featuring Diddy & Ludacris)	 
 Drake – "Stay Schemin'" (Rick Ross featuring Drake and French Montana)
 Ludacris – "Same Damn Time (Remix)" (Future featuring Diddy & Ludacris)
 T.I. – "Magic (Remix)"  (Future featuring T.I.)

Hustler of the Year 
 Jay Z
 2 Chainz	 
 Lil Wayne 
 Rick Ross	 
 Kanye West

Impact Track 
Nas – "Daughters"
 Lupe Fiasco – "Around My Way (Freedom Ain't Free)"
 Lupe Fiasco – "B*tch Bad"
 The Throne (Jay Z & Kanye West) – "Murder to Excellence"

People's Champ Award 
 2 Chainz featuring Drake – "No Lie"
 Driicky Graham – "Snapbacks & Tattoos"	 
 Meek Mill featuring Rick Ross – "Ima Boss"	 
 The Throne (Jay Z & Kanye West) featuring Otis Redding – "Otis"	 
 Kanye West featuring Big Sean, Pusha T and 2 Chainz – "Mercy"

Best Hip Hop Online Site 
 WorldStarHipHop.com
 2DopeBoyz.com 
 Allhiphop.com	 
 Complex.com 
 HipHopDX.com	 
 NahRight.com	 
 RapRadar.com

I Am Hip Hop Award 
Rakim

References 

BET Hip Hop Awards
BET Hip Hop Awards